Megachilopus is a genus of mites in the family Acaridae.

Species
 Megachilopus uellensis Fain, 1974

References

Acaridae